The Ugly Duckling is a 1959 British science fiction comedy film, directed by Lance Comfort and starring Bernard Bresslaw, Jon Pertwee and Reginald Beckwith.  The film is a comic adaptation of Robert Louis Stevenson's 1886 Dr. Jekyll and Mr. Hyde storyline and the opening credits include "with ideas stolen from Robert Louis Stevenson". The film has no connection to the Hans Christian Andersen story. The tagline on posters was "He's a changed man after taking Jekyll's family remedy."

Plot
Joe Loss and his Orchestra are playing at a dance. Joe Loss then introduces the Henrietta Jekyll Old Time Dance Team and her brother Henry Jekyll, who is a rather incompetent last-minute stand-in. They give a display of formation ballroom dancing with their brother Victor Jekyll (Jon Pertwee) taking over the conducting, but Henry turns it into a disaster, much to his sister's dismay.

Henry (Bernard Bresslaw) is a bungling, awkward and socially inept man. He is working in his brother’s pharmacy, which is still named after their great-great-grandfather: "Dr Henry Jekyll M.D. - Pharmacy, Estabd. 1812". Victor and Henrietta discuss their worries about Henry as he goes to bed with his golliwog.

Reginald Bannister comes to woo Henrietta but suggests that Henry should be kept out of the way if they marry. Henry is in the pharmacy lab when his elfin young female friend Snouty appears and accuses him of being a square. Luckily they are both in the rear yard when the lab explodes. The explosion reveals a small metal box containing a scroll. The scroll contains an old formula created by Dr Jekyll in the 19th century which claims to turn "a man of timid disposition into a bold, fearless dragon". He eagerly mixes the formula, takes one drink, and is transformed into the suave, dashing and self-confident Teddy Hyde, who makes a big impression at the local dance hall and with the ladies. He encounters Victor at the bar but is unrecognised, and belittles Victor by pouring a drink down the front of his trousers. This draws attention to the crooks who own the dance hall. They are initially going to throw him out but he impresses the boss, Dandy, with his bravado and he recruits him for a robbery he has planned. Teddy leaves just as the potion wears off and Henry wakes in his bed with a bad headache, and his only memory of the events of the previous night is that he thinks it was a dream.

Later, Henry accidentally drinks the formula again, and Teddy leaves to join up with Dandy for the robbery.
When Snouty tells Victor that the person at the dance hall was called Hyde, he immediately understands the connection from the family history and realises something must be done. Meanwhile, Teddy breaks into a house through a rooflight and cracks a safe to steal some very valuable jewels. As he and Dandy leave, they separate to avoid a policeman, but the formula wears off and when Dandy draws up to pick him up he does not recognise him, so Henry is unwittingly left with the jewels.

Next morning, when Victor and Snouty see Henry, who again has a bad headache and cannot remember where he was last night, they question him and are shocked to find the jewels still in his pocket. Having decided to return them, Snouty gets into Dandy's office to try to find where the jewels are from, but she is caught by the gang and reveals that Henry plans to return the jewels.

With Victor's help, Henry then starts to remember being Hyde and together they try to replace the jewels before they are missed, but they barge in on a special event to show off the jewels, which Henrietta and Reginald are attending. Dandy and a sidekick are also there to make another attempt at getting the jewels. Victor and Henry struggle on the roof due to their fear of heights. Meanwhile, the police and show organisers find the jewels are missing. Victor and Henry eventually get in and find the still-open safe and return the jewels. The police then return and see the jewels and the show continues as intended. Dandy in the audience realises the jewels are back, so he and his accomplice pull guns to steal the jewels. Snouty convinces Henry that he can do anything Hyde can do and he takes on the armed Dandy. Victor has hidden behind Dandy and knocks him out before he can fire on Henry.

Later, at a special event at the dance hall in honour of Henry, he and Snouty (in a dress) dance for the first time.

Cast
 Bernard Bresslaw as Henry Jekyll / Teddy Hyde
 Jon Pertwee as Victor Jekyll
 Reginald Beckwith as Reginald Bannister
 Maudie Edwards as Henrietta Jekyll
 Jean Muir as Snouty
 Richard Wattis as Inspector Barclay
 Elwyn Brook-Jones as Dandy
 Michael Ripper as Fish
 Harold Goodwin as Benny
 David Lodge as Peewee
 Keith Smith as Figures
 Michael Ward as Mark Pasco
 John Harvey as Sgt. Barnes
 Jess Conrad as Bimbo
 Norma Marla as Angel
 Jean Driant as Monsieur Blum
 Verne Morgan as the barman
 Robert Desmond as Dizzy
 Roger Avon as Reporter
 Cyril Chamberlain as Police Sergeant
 Joe Loss as himself

Production

Filming occurred at Bray Studios in Berkshire. The film was shot in the summer of 1959. It was not a success at the box office, losing £20,000. However, Jerry Lewis’s comedy The Nutty Professor made just four years later, which has a similar plot, was a box office success.

A brief extract from James Bernard’s theme to Dracula (1958) (also made for Hammer Films) is played whenever Jeckle drinks the potion.

Critical reception
TV Guide gave the film two out of five stars, and wrote, "This attempt at comedy never really pays off."

References

External links 
 

1959 films
1959 comedy films
1959 horror films
1950s comedy horror films
British comedy films
Columbia Pictures films
Films directed by Lance Comfort
Hammer Film Productions films
British black-and-white films
1950s English-language films
Dr. Jekyll and Mr. Hyde films
Films shot at Bray Studios
Films with screenplays by Sid Colin
1960s English-language films
1950s British films
1960s British films